Baek Jong-won's Alley Restaurant is a South Korean cooking-variety program that has been broadcast since January 5, 2018. It is a spin-off of cooking-variety program Baek Jong-won's Top 3 Chef King. It is currently hosted by Baek Jong-won and Kim Sung-joo, it aired on SBS every Friday at 23:20 (KST). Starting from August 29, 2018, the program changed the broadcast time slot to every Wednesday at 23:10 (KST), and compete for viewership ratings against MBC's Radio Star (Kim Gu-ra), JTBC's Let's Eat Dinner Together (Lee Kyung-kyu and Kang Ho-dong) and tvN's You Quiz on the Block (Yoo Jae-suk).

On October 25, 2021, it was announced that the program will conclude with 200 episodes by end of 2021 with last filming held on November 26.

Cast

Main host
Baek Jong-won (Episodes 1–200)
Kim Sung-joo (Episodes 1–200)

Special co-host
Kim Se-jeong (Gugudan) (Episodes 1–10)
Jo Bo-ah (Episodes 11–59)
Jung In-sun (Episodes 60–168)
Keum Sae-rok (Episodes 169–200)

Guest

 (Episodes 1–5)
 (Episodes 1–5)
Don Spike (Episodes 6–10)
Cao Lu (Fiestar) (Episodes 6–10)
Sayuri Fujita (Episodes 11–15)
Andy (Shinhwa) (Episodes 11–15)
Heo Kyung-hwan (Episodes 11–15)
Lee Myung-hoon (Episodes 13–15)
Hwang Chi-yeul (Episodes 16–20)
Nam Bo-ra (Episodes 16–20)
Tei (Episodes 21–25)
Bae Yoon-kyung (Episodes 21–25)
Kim Min-kyo (Episodes 26–29)
Jung In-sun (Episodes 26–29)

List of episodes

Series overview

2018

2019

2020

2021

Ratings
In the table below,  represent the lowest ratings and  represent the highest ratings.

2018

2019

2020

2021

Cancellation of broadcasting

Awards and nominations

References

External links
 

2018 South Korean television series debuts
2021 South Korean television series endings
Korean-language television shows
Seoul Broadcasting System original programming
South Korean variety television shows
South Korean cooking television series